Miniature Lop is a breed of domestic rabbit recognised by the British Rabbit Council (BRC). Confusion arises because, in the UK, the Miniature Lop is often commonly called (for short) the Mini Lop. It is, however, a different breed from the Mini Lop that is recognized by the American Rabbit Breeders Association (ARBA). The BRC-recognized Miniature Lop is most similar to the ARBA-recognized Holland Lop. The Miniature Lop is also similar to several other small rabbit breeds.

History 
The Miniature Lop in Britain is a relatively new rabbit breed, and it is descended from the first dwarf lops that were developed in the Netherlands during the 1970s. These are now called, in the US, the Holland Lop, but in the Netherlands, they are known as the Miniature Lop.

A Dutch rabbit breeder, Adriann de Cock, is generally credited with developing in late 1949 the dwarf lop breeds, by crossing the French Lop (one of the largest of the lop breeds) with the tiny Netherland Dwarf.

Ten years later, these smaller Holland Lops were imported to Britain by George Scott of Yorkshire via a Dutch contact.

Weight 

Females usually grow larger than the male.

Appearance 
Coat - The coat to be dense and of good length, rollback with an abundance of
guard hairs. Legs and pads to be well furred.

Head, Crown and Eyes - The head is bold, broad and well developed. The
profile of the head is strongly curved with a good width between the eyes, full
cheeks and a broad muzzle.
The eyes are bold, bright and large. The basal ridge of the ears should appear
prominent across the top of the skull to form the crown.

Ears  - Should be broad, thick, well furred and rounded at the ends. They
should be carried close to the cheeks giving a horseshoe like outline when
viewed from the front. The inside of the ears should not be visible from any
angle when carried correctly.

Color 

Agouti, Black, Blue, Brown, Butterfly, Chinchilla, Fawn, Fox, Opal, Orange, Sable Marten, Sealpoint, Siamese Sable,  Siamese Smoke, Sooty Fawn,  Steel,  White

Lifespan

The expected lifespan of this rabbit is between 7 and 14 years, but they can live up to 18 years if properly cared for.

Gallery

See also

List of rabbit breeds
Dwarf rabbit
Lop rabbit

References

Citations

Sources 

 Miniature lop (UK). bunnyhugga.com. Retrieved July 2011
 Holland Lop Rabbit Specialty Club Official Guidebook - 5th Edition 2002

External links 
 The British Rabbit Council
 The National Miniature Lop Rabbit Club
 Holland Lop Rabbit Specialty Club
 House Rabbit Society
 Famous Instagram Bunnies

Lop rabbits
Rabbit breeds originating in England